Eric Ogden may refer to:

Eric Ogden (photographer), American photographer 
Eric Ogden (politician) (1923–1997), British politician